Svetla Damyanovska (Bulgarian: Светла Дамяновска) is a Bulgarian writer. She is an author of six books of poetry and two fiction books and a member of the Union of the Bulgarian writers.

References

External links
 Svetla Damyanovska's Profile at the Contemporary Bulgarian Writers Website

Living people
Bulgarian women writers
Bulgarian poets
Bulgarian novelists
21st-century Bulgarian novelists
21st-century Bulgarian poets
Bulgarian women poets
Bulgarian women novelists
21st-century Bulgarian women writers
Year of birth missing (living people)